Virendra Bhatia (22 April 1947 – 24 May 2010) was a politician from the Samajwadi Party and  a Member of the Parliament of India represented Uttar Pradesh in the Rajya Sabha, the upper house of the Indian Parliament. His son Gaurav Bhatia is the national spokesperson of the Bharatiya Janata Party.

Bhatia died on 24 May 2010 in Apollo Hospital in New Delhi after a short illness.

References

1947 births
2010 deaths
Samajwadi Party politicians
People from Sialkot
Rajya Sabha members from Uttar Pradesh
Samajwadi Party politicians from Uttar Pradesh